The Francis Scott Key Bridge, more commonly known as the Key Bridge, is a six-lane reinforced concrete arch bridge conveying U.S. Route 29 (US 29) traffic across the Potomac River between the Rosslyn neighborhood of Arlington County, Virginia, and the Georgetown neighborhood of Washington, D.C. Completed in 1923, it is Washington's oldest surviving road bridge across the Potomac River.

Key Bridge was added to the National Register of Historic Places in 1996.

History

Deterioration of the Aqueduct Bridge
The Key Bridge replaced the older Aqueduct Bridge.  The first Aqueduct Bridge was built in 1830 to carry the Chesapeake and Ohio Canal across the Potomac to connect with the Alexandria Canal on the Virginia shore.  The bridge was converted into a roadway during the American Civil War. In 1866, the canal was restored and a new wooden roadway built over it atop trestles.  The 1830 bridge was torn down in 1884, and a new structure built which opened in 1889. The Washington and Virginia abutments still survive. Both are located a short distance west of the Key Bridge.  Between the two abutments, a pier remains in  the river near the Virginia shore (See Demolition of Aqueduct Bridge).
 
Proposals were made to replace the Aqueduct Bridge as early as 1901. But these proposals were delayed when the McMillan Plan was issued in 1902. The plan's proposals for new bridges across the Potomac called into question whether Aqueduct Bridge should be replaced or merely torn down. In the meantime, Congress approved repairs to the bridge in 1902 1908, and 1913.

The Carlin bill
In March 1914, Representative Charles Creighton Carlin of Virginia sponsored legislation to replace Aqueduct Bridge with a new, $1 million structure. The Commissioners of the District of Columbia (the city's appointed government) approved the new bridge in June. Controversy over the new bridge immediately broke out. Georgetown merchants strongly opposed this plan. There were some in Congress who wanted to repair the existing bridge, but a study by the United States Army Corps of Engineers in August 1914 showed that the existing structure was inadequate for the amount of traffic and too unstable to be saved. Secretary of War Lindley Miller Garrison, who oversaw the Corps, agreed that a new bridge was necessary in December. Rep. William C. Adamson, chairman of the House Committee on Public Works, challenged Swanson and declared that the new bridge should be placed where the old one was.

The Carlin bill began moving through the House in January 1915. But House members balked at the cost. Garrison tried to break the deadlock on January 9 by issuing a report that declared the existing bridge unsafe, and requesting that the new one be built in the same location. The D.C. Commissioners said the location of the bridge was up to them, and the Corps warned that not only could the existing bridge not be enlarged but agreed with Garrison that it was structurally unsound. Swanson changed his mind, and agreed in January 1916 that the new bridge should be built on the existing site. Garrison endorsed the Carlin bill on January 27. On February 3, 1916, vehicular traffic over Aqueduct Bridge was limited by the city to a single automobile at a time due to its dangerous nature. The House passed legislation appropriating $1.175 million for construction of a new bridge on March 6. D.C. commissioners held hearings on the bridge site in late March, and approved the site in early April. The Senate passed some minor amendments to the House bill, and after some legislative discussions and a conference committee, the Carlin bill passed Congress on May 2, 1916. President Woodrow Wilson signed the legislation on May 19.

Construction 

On June 1, 1916, the Army Corps of Engineers named the new bridge "Francis Scott Key Bridge," in honor of the man who had written the lyrics to the Star Spangled Banner whose home was just a few blocks from the bridge's abutment. Plans began to be drawn up at that time.

The Classical Revival bridge was designed by Nathan C. Wyeth, an architect in private practice in the city, and Major Max C. Tyler, an engineer with the Army Corps of Engineers. The legislation authorizing the bridge's construction required that the United States Department of War consult with the United States Commission of Fine Arts (CFA) in the design of the bridge. Subsequently, the Chief of Engineers of the Army Corps of Engineers asked the CFA for a list of architects whom the CFA believed would be competent to design an aesthetically pleasing bridge. The CFA swiftly provided a list, and in July 1916 Tyler met with the CFA to discuss a short list of potential architects. The CFA and Tyler also conferred on the bridge's orientation, design, and approaches. Tyler selected Wyeth. The plans were nearly complete by September. Wyeth and Tyler's initial design for the bridge was a double-deck structure with a single, high span. But with World War I erupting in Europe, inflation made this structure too costly. Wyeth then submitted a design for a single-deck, single-span bridge on January 12, 1917. The CFA asked Wyeth to design a multi-span bridge, or, failing that, to construct non-structural decorative elements that would make it look as if the bridge had multiple spans. Wyeth agreed, and the CFA approved the bridge design.

In January 1917, the Corps of Engineers found that inflation in the price of construction materials made it necessary to ask for $300,000 more in funding from Congress. Congress balked at paying. But citizen pressure and the danger of Aqueduct Bridge's collapse due to ice flows in the spring convinced Congress to pay the money.

Construction contracts were drawn up in late February, and excavation work on the D.C. abutments began in March. The first coffer dam for construction of the piers was sunk in May 1918, and the old Aqueduct Bridge formally closed on July 9.  Immense amounts of concrete were needed to construct the bridge. One concrete mixing plant was constructed on the D.C. shore, and concrete was delivered to the worksite in the river by ropeway conveyor. A second mixing plant was constructed in mid-river: The plant was floated into position, and then allowed to sink down to the riverbed. Steel for the reinforced concrete structure and for the steel arches within its spans was assembled on the D.C. shoreline, then floated by barge to the worksite. Progress was slow, as reinforced concrete was a relatively new type of construction. The project ran out of money, and Tyler requested and won an additional $1.1 million from Congress in 1920 to finish the work.

The new $2.35 million Key Bridge opened on January 17, 1923. The federal government turned title to the bridge over to the District of Columbia on November 15, 1924.

The old Aqueduct Bridge was razed beginning in December 1933. The Aqueduct Bridge's superstructure and most of the above-water portions of its piers were removed in 1933. The bases of the piers were retained to protect the Key Bridge's piers from ice floe damage.

Description 

The Key Bridge spans the Potomac River, connecting the Georgetown neighborhood in the District of Columbia with the neighborhood of Rosslyn in Arlington County, Virginia. Key Bridge is Washington's oldest existing road bridge across the Potomac River.

The bridge is an open-spandrel, arched structure oriented in a north-south direction and constructed of reinforced concrete and steel. To lighten the load on the span arches, the spandrels were filled with additional arches. Depending on the size of the span, there are either three or four spandrel arches. Together, the span arch and spandrel arches form a truss. The piers were decorated with pilasters in the Doric style.

The northern terminus of the bridge is just east of the site of Francis Scott Key's home, which was dismantled in the late 1940s. A park honoring Key now occupies the site. The bridge connects with M Street NW, Canal Road NW, and the Whitehurst Freeway (which provides access to K Street NW and downtown). The northbound span has an exit ramp to the eastbound Whitehurst Freeway; however, traffic from the westbound Whitehurst Freeway to the southbound span must use M Street.

The southern terminus of the bridge is in the state of Virginia. Northbound traffic accesses the bridge via North Lynn Street, with southbound traffic exits the bridge via North Fort Myer Drive. A cloverleaf ramp from southbound George Washington Memorial Parkway connects to northbound North Lynn Street just before the bridge. Southbound traffic may turn right onto an off-ramp leading to northbound George Washington Memorial Parkway. The bridge's southbound off-ramp connect with north/west-bound U.S. Route 29. Traffic wishing to access southbound Interstate 66 (the Custis Memorial Parkway) must do so by traversing local Rosslyn streets.

A horizontal, decorative molding ran along the outer edge of the bridge. Atop this cornice was a paneled parapet. Between each baluster of the parapet is a  recessed panel. Atop the parapet were street lights.

The bridge had five arches when constructed. Separate spans completed the approaches to the bridge.

Renovations and alterations

1939 alterations
Francis Scott Key Bridge was significantly altered in 1938 when Congress extended the George Washington Memorial Parkway north along the Virginia shoreline past Key Bridge. A new  span over the parkway was added in 1939, giving the bridge an eighth span.

1955 alterations
Another major alteration to the bridge occurred in 1955. The District of Columbia was transitioning to buses from streetcars, and as part of this change the streetcar tracks over the bridge were torn out. The parapet and original street lights were also removed.

1987 alterations

An entirely new roadway deck was installed in 1986-87. The new road deck was a bonded post-tensioned concrete deck  in width. The new parapet resembles the 1923 railing.

On March 1, 1996, the Key Bridge was added to the National Register of Historic Places.

2014 rehabilitation

Key Bridge underwent a major inspection in 2011.  Officials were concerned that the chemical agents used to bond the tensioned cables running through the concrete road deck were corroding the concrete. The architectural engineering firm of Johnson, Mirmiran & Thompson (JMT) was hired to inspect the bridge. JMT discovered that the deck slab was ready to fail, and there was extensive corrosive deterioration of the underside of the concrete deck. Cracks were also found in some of the abutments, arches and spandrel arches, concrete deck, and piers. The sonic echo/impulse response method was used to identify areas within the concrete where cables had disintegrated or where corrosion had created voids. JMT restored some deteriorated portions of the deck. The bridge was rated "structurally deficient" after these tests.

In 2013, Key Bridge carried approximately 62,000 vehicles each day. The Washington Post in April 2014 called Key Bridge one of the three "busiest deficient bridges" in the District of Columbia, along with Arlington Memorial Bridge and the connection between Park Road and the Anacostia Freeway.

The District of Columbia Department of Transportation (DDOT) announced a two-year, $21 million rehabilitation of the bridge in April 2014. In addition to repairing the previously-identified structural issues, the street lights were replaced with modern energy-efficient lampposts, the guard rail between the roadway and sidewalks was strengthened, the bridge's drainage system fixed and improved, and the bridge painted.

2016 rehabilitation

A second round of rehabilitation work on Key Bridge was scheduled for fall 2015, although the contract was not announced until October 2015, delaying work about six months. The two-year, $30 million project was intended to replace more street lights with modern fixtures, strengthen the deck overhangs on both sides of the bridge, repair the concrete deck beneath the roadway, repair cracked and broken portions of the concrete superstructure, repair the reinforced concrete beams beneath the concrete deck, improve drainage, and clad the footings of the piers with "fiber-reinforced polymer jackets" to inhibit corrosion. The right lanes of the bridge is being treated with a resin as a test to see if the material will help reduce water infiltration and corrosion. Minor repairs and alterations will also improve pedestrian and bicycle safety on the ramp to the eastbound Whitehurst Freeway. These include removing bollards that narrow the sidewalk, and installing cameras that detect pedestrians and bicycles and will trigger flashing lights on the ramp to warn motorists about their presence. Work began in October 2016 and was to last two years, but was still ongoing in August 2019.

See also
 
 
 
 

 List of bridges documented by the Historic American Engineering Record in Washington, D.C.
 List of bridges on the National Register of Historic Places in Virginia
 List of bridges on the National Register of Historic Places in Washington, D.C.
 National Register of Historic Places listings in Arlington County, Virginia
 National Register of Historic Places listings in Washington, D.C.
 Architecture of Washington, D.C.

References

Bibliography

External links

Bridges completed in 1923
Road bridges on the National Register of Historic Places in Washington, D.C.
Historic American Engineering Record in Washington, D.C.
Neoclassical architecture in Washington, D.C.
Neoclassical architecture in Virginia
Bridges over the Potomac River
Georgetown (Washington, D.C.)
Road bridges on the National Register of Historic Places in Virginia
Transportation in Arlington County, Virginia
U.S. Route 29
Buildings and structures in Arlington County, Virginia
Bridges of the United States Numbered Highway System
National Register of Historic Places in Arlington County, Virginia
1923 establishments in Virginia
Concrete bridges in the United States
Open-spandrel deck arch bridges in the United States